Woman of Darkness or The Yngsjö Murder (Swedish: Yngsjömordet) is a 1966 Swedish historical crime film directed by Arne Mattsson and starring Gunnel Lindblom, Christina Schollin and Gösta Ekman.   It was shot at the Råsunda Studios in Stockholm. The film's sets were designed by the art director P.A. Lundgren. It was based on the real Yngsjö murder case of 1889. It was a critical success and drew significant audiences.

Cast
 Gunnel Lindblom as 	Anna / Mother
 Christina Schollin as 	Hanna / Per's wife
 Gösta Ekman as 	Per / Son-Hanna's husband
 Heinz Hopf as 	Helmertz / Judge
 Elsa Prawitz as 	Hilda Persdotter
 Rune Lindström as 	Wahlbom
 Isa Quensel as 	Grave-Karna
 Tore Lindwall as 	Johan Olsson
 Lasse Krantz as Erik Olsson
 Gösta Bernhard as 	Jöns Persson
 Stefan Ekman as 	Vicar Hasselqvist
 Frej Lindqvist as 	H.N. Hansson
 Curt Ericson as 	Dalman
 Arne Strand as 	Persson / fångvaktare-jailer
 Gudrun Östbye as 	Johanna Hansson
 Christian Bratt as 	Schneider - fängelsedirektör
 Julie Bernby as 	Hannas mor
 Maritta Marke as 	Stina Edvards
 Axel Düberg as 	Johanna Hanssons man
 Cleo Boman as Bengta Jönsdotter
 Birger Lensander as Ola Svensson 
 Monique Ernstdotter as Anna Jönsson

References

Bibliography 
 Björklund, Elisabet & Larsson, Mariah. Swedish Cinema and the Sexual Revolution: Critical Essays. McFarland, 2016.
 Qvist, Per Olov & von Bagh, Peter. Guide to the Cinema of Sweden and Finland. Greenwood Publishing Group, 2000.

External links 
 

1966 films
Swedish crime films
1966 crime films
1960s Swedish-language films
Films directed by Arne Mattsson
Films set in the 1880s
Swedish historical films
1960s historical films
1960s Swedish films